La La Land is the fifth and final studio album by Texas noise rock band Ed Hall, released on May 23, 1995 by Trance Syndicate.

Track listing

Personnel
Adapted from the La La Land liner notes.

Ed Hall
 Gary Chester – electric guitar, vocals
 Lyman Hardy – drums, photography
 Larry Strub – bass guitar, vocals

Production and additional personnel
 John Golden – mastering
 Ed Hall – production
 Brian Fulk – engineering
 Martin Harris – photography
 Adam Wiltzie – engineering

Release history

References

External links 
 

1995 albums
Ed Hall (band) albums
Trance Syndicate albums